Elvin Maerle "Sonny" Liles (August 9, 1919 – July 25, 2005) was an American football guard who played three seasons in the National Football League with the Detroit Lions and Cleveland Rams. He played college football at Oklahoma A&M College and attended Clinton High School in Clinton, Oklahoma.

References

External links
Just Sports Stats

1919 births
2005 deaths
Players of American football from Oklahoma
American football guards
Oklahoma State Cowboys football players
Detroit Lions players
Cleveland Rams players
People from Marlow, Oklahoma